The slime flounder (Microstomus achne) is a kind of flatfish from the family Pleuronectidae. Its native habitat is the temperate waters of the northwest Pacific, from the East China Sea to the Yellow Sea and the Sea of Japan, as far as Sakhalin and the Kuril Islands.

Diet
The diet of the slime flounder consists mainly of zoobenthos organisms such as polychaetes and crabs.

References

slime flounder
Marine fauna of East Asia
Commercial fish
slime flounder
Taxa named by David Starr Jordan